Smoke's Poutinerie is a Canadian poutine restaurant franchise founded by Ryan Smolkin. According to the company's website, its goal is to "bring the authentic Quebec classic to the rest of the World."

History 
Ryan Smolkin, the founder of Smoke’s Poutinerie, worked alongside Toronto restaurant consultants The Fifteen Group when starting out, in order to gain experience in the restaurant industry. With the help of The Fifteen Group’s chef, the original gravy recipe was developed.

In 2008, Smoke’s Poutinerie opened its first location in Toronto. It was the first poutine restaurant in the city. Smolkin was inspired by Montreal restaurant La Banquise, which serves many different kinds of poutine. Smolkin frequents La Banquise whenever he visits Montreal. Smolkin's marketing campaign focuses on "word of mouth and publicity stunts" instead of traditional advertising.

In 2016, Smoke's Poutinerie had 76 restaurants in Canada and 5 in the USA. They planned to expand the company internationally and open 1,300 restaurants around the world by 2020. Smoke’s Poutinerie had already started on this expansion, having sold franchises to franchisees in the USA. By 2017, the restaurant had some 150 locations across Canada and USA. Smoke's opened its first location in the US, in Berkeley, California in 2014. That location closed in April 2018. The four other USA locations have also closed. According to their websites, as of August 20, 2022, there are currently 49 locations all in Canada.

Poutine Eating Championship 
The Annual Smoke’s Poutinerie World Poutine Eating Championship crowns a new champion each year, and in 2016 a world record was broken for poutine eating. The event includes 3 levels of poutine eating including amateur, professional, and Destroyer. Throughout the day Smoke’s Poutinerie provides free poutine all day from 10am-4pm, musical entertainment, games, prizes, and giveaways.

In 2016, the event focused on raising money for the Friends of We Care charity and raised over $50,000 to send disabled children to camp.

Competition 
Smoke’s Poutinerie entered a competitive market. Most large Canadian restaurant chains already had a basic poutine item on their menu. Over the years including Poutini’s House of Poutine which opened its second location in Toronto 2015, and Poutineville which as of May 2019, has 6 restaurants in Quebec.

Smoke's Poutinerie entered  further competition has come from corporate businesses. McDonald's expanded its poutine product from being only in Quebec, Canada, to the entire country of Canada. In 2012, Wendy’s added poutine to their menu as Canada’s national dish. Since McDonald's and Wendy’s, more companies have added poutine to their menus including Burger King, A&W, KFC, Popeyes and New York Fries to name a few.

See also
List of Canadian restaurant chains

References

External links

Where to get Toronto's best poutine at Toronto Star
A podcast of CBC Radio "Q"; Jian Ghomeshi interviews Marion Kane on the origins of Poutine

Restaurant chains in Canada
Restaurants established in 2008
2008 establishments in Ontario
Companies based in Ontario
Ajax, Ontario